Harewood Downs Golf Club is a golf club, located circa  south-east of Amersham, Buckinghamshire, England. It is located northwest of Chalfont Saint Giles and southeast of Amersham. It was established in 1907. Lord Birkett, noted for being the judge who presided over the Sir Oswald Mosley trial during World War II, was a member of the club.

References

Golf clubs and courses in Buckinghamshire
1907 establishments in England